Mihai Ionuț Butean (born 14 September 1996) is a Romanian professional footballer who plays as a right-back or a midfielder for Liga I club FC Hermannstadt.

Honours
Astra Giurgiu
Cupa României runner-up: 2016–17, 2018–19
Supercupa României: 2016
CFR Cluj
Liga I: 2019–20
Supercupa României runner-up: 2021

References

External links

1996 births
Living people
Sportspeople from Cluj-Napoca
Romania under-21 international footballers
Romanian footballers
Association football defenders
Liga I players
FC Astra Giurgiu players
CFR Cluj players
FC Hermannstadt players
Liga II players
FC Universitatea Cluj players
LPS HD Clinceni players
CS Gaz Metan Mediaș players
AFC Chindia Târgoviște players